Reports of Cases argued and determined in the High Court of Chancery, in the time of Lord Hardwicke, from 1737 to 1754 is the title of a collection of nominate reports, by John Tracy Atkyns, of cases decided by the Court of Chancery between approximately 1736 and 1755. For the purpose of citation their name may be abbreviated to "Atk". They are in three volumes. They are reprinted in volume 26 of the English Reports.

Authority and accuracy
J. G. Marvin said:

References
Atkyns, J T. Reports of Cases argued and determined in the High Court of Chancery, in the time of Lord Hardwicke, from 1737 to 1754. 3d ed. By F. W. Sanders. 3 vols. 8vo. London. 1794. New York. 1826.
"The Reporters and Text Writers" (1875) 1 Southern Law Review 223 and 498

External links
Cases argued and determined in the High Court of Chancery, in the time of Lord Chancellor Hardwicke. By John Tracy Atkyns. Third Edition. By Francis William Sanders. Printed by the King's Law Printers. London. 1754. vol 2. 1782. Vol 3 1794. Vols 1 and 3

Sets of reports reprinted in the English Reports
Court of Chancery